The hammer throw at the World Championships in Athletics has been contested by both men since the inaugural edition in 1983, and by women since 1999.

Medalists

Men

Women

References 
 

 
Hammer
World Athletics Championships